Parkeol is a relatively uncommon sterol secondary metabolite found mostly in plants, particularly noted in Butyrospermum parkii (now called Vitellaria paradoxa, or the shea tree). It can be synthesized as a minor product by several oxidosqualene cyclase enzymes, and is the sole product of the enzyme parkeol synthase.

Parkeol is the dominant sterol found in the planctomycete Gemmata obscuriglobus, a rare example of a sterol-synthesizing prokaryote. The only other sterol identified in this organism is lanosterol, a key component of the sterol biosynthetic pathway in animals and fungi; this relatively limited sterol repertoire may resemble the early evolution of sterol synthesis, which is ubiquitous in eukaryotes.

References

Sterols
Triterpenes